Aleksandër Trumçi (born 31 December 2000) is an Albanian professional footballer who plays as a right-back  for Kategoria Superiore club Bylis, where is the club captain.

Career statistics

Club

Notes

References

External links
 Profile - Albanian Football Association
 Profile - Eurosport

2000 births
Living people
Sportspeople from Shkodër
Albanian footballers
Association football defenders
Association football fullbacks
KS Veleçiku Koplik players
KF Bylis Ballsh players
Kategoria e Parë players
Kategoria Superiore players